James Power may refer to:

 James Power (comics), a fictional character in Marvel comics
 James Power (empresario) (1788/89–1852), Irish-born Texan empresario and politician 
 James Power (ice hockey) (1884–1920), Canadian ice hockey player
 James Power (planter) (1790–1870), namesake for Powers Ferry vicinity, north of Atlanta, Georgia, U.S.
 James Power (politician) (c. 1796–1847), of Newfoundland, Canada
 James Power (sculptor)] (1918–2009), Irish sculptor
 James Aloysius Power, mayor of Waterford
 James Augustine Power (1903–1975), Canadian member of Parliament (1953–1957)
 Sir James Power, 2nd Baronet (1800–1877), Irish politician, barrister, and Governor of the Bank of Ireland
 J. D. Power III (James David Power III, 1931), American marketer
 James Power, the 1791 Irish founder of the Powers (whiskey) brand
 James Power, 3rd Earl of Tyrone (1667–1704), Irish Jacobite nobleman

See also 
 James Powers (disambiguation)
 Jim Powers (disambiguation)